MiNT is Now TOS (MiNT) is a free software alternative operating system kernel for the Atari ST system and its successors. It is a multi-tasking alternative to TOS and MagiC. Together with the free system components fVDI device drivers, XaAES graphical user interface widgets, and TeraDesk file manager, MiNT provides a free TOS compatible replacement OS that can multitask.

History 
Work on MiNT began in 1989, as the developer Eric Smith was trying to port the GNU library and related utilities on the Atari ST TOS. It turned out quickly, that it was much easier to add a Unix-like layer to the TOS, than to patch all of the GNU software, and MiNT began as a TOS extension to help in porting.

MiNT was originally released by Eric Smith as "MiNT is Not TOS" (a recursive acronym in the style of "GNU's Not Unix") in May 1990. The new Kernel got traction, with people contributing a port of the MINIX Filesystem and a port to the Atari TT.

At the same time Atari was looking to enhance the TOS with multitasking abilities, they found that MiNT could fulfill the job, and hired Eric Smith. MiNT was adopted as an official alternative kernel with the release of the Atari Falcon, slightly altering the MiNT acronym into "MiNT is Now TOS". Atari bundled MiNT with a multitasking version of the Graphics Environment Manager (GEM) under the name MultiTOS as a floppy disk based installer.

After Atari left the computer market, MiNT development continued under the name FreeMiNT, and is now maintained by a team of volunteers. FreeMiNT development follows a classic open-source approach, with the source code hosted on a publicly browsable FreeMiNT Git repository on GitHub and development discussed in a public mailing list., which is maintained on SourceForge, after an earlier (2014) move from AtariForge, where it was maintained for almost 20 years.

Hardware requirements 
A minimal install of MiNT will run on an Atari ST with its stock 8 MHz 68000 CPU, with 4 MB RAM and a hard drive.  It is highly recommended that an Atari computer with a 16 MHz 68030 CPU and 8 MB of RAM be used.

MiNT can also run inside the emulators Hatari and STEem, and with networking on the 68040 virtual machine Aranym.

MiNT software ecosystem 
FreeMiNT provides only a kernel, so several distributions support MiNT, like VanillaMint, EasyMint, STMint and BeeKey/BeePi.

Although FreeMiNT can use the graphical user interface of the TOS (the Graphics Environment Manager GEM and the Application Environment Services or AES), it is better served with an enhanced AES which can use its multi-tasking abilities.

The default one is currently XaAES, which is developed as a FreeMiNT kernel module. The older N.AES also works, however the modern alternative is MyAES

See also 
 XaAES
 EmuTOS
 SpareMiNT
 Hatari (emulator)

References

External links 
 FreeMiNT Project website
 , MyAeS
 Unofficial XaAES website
  MiNT is Now TOS—an interview with Mr Eric R. Smith, the creator of MiNT
 FreeMiNT mailing list
 FreeMiNT mailing list archives 
 FreeMiNT wiki 
 XaAES source
 FreeMiNT support forum

Atari ST software
Disk operating systems
Free software operating systems
Atari operating systems